In computability theory complete numberings are generalizations of Gödel numbering first introduced by A.I. Mal'tsev in 1963. They are studied because several important results like the Kleene's recursion theorem and Rice's theorem, which were originally proven for the Gödel-numbered set of computable functions, still hold for arbitrary sets with complete numberings.

Definition 

A numbering  of a set  is called complete (with respect to an element ) if for every partial computable function  there exists a total computable function  so that (Ershov 1999:482):

Ershov refers to the element a as a "special" element for the numbering.  A numbering  is called precomplete if the weaker property holds:

Examples 

 Any numbering of a singleton set is complete
 The identity function on the natural numbers is not complete
 A Gödel numbering is precomplete

References 
 Y.L. Ershov (1999), "Theory of numberings", Handbook of Computability Theory, E.R. Griffor (ed.), Elsevier, pp. 473–506. 
 A.I. Mal'tsev, Sets with complete numberings. Algebra i Logika, 1963, vol. 2, no. 2, 4-29 (Russian)

Computability theory